This list contains the names of albums that contain a hidden track and also information on how to find them. Not all printings of an album contain the same track arrangements, so some copies of a particular album may not have the hidden track(s) listed below. Some of these tracks may be hidden in the pregap, and some hidden simply as a track following the listed tracks. The list is ordered by artist name using the surname where appropriate.

 Tait, Empty (2001): Rewinding from the start of the album reveals various random recordings of the band
 Take That:
 Beautiful World (2006): The hidden track "Butterfly" appears at the end of "Wooden Boat."
 The Circus (2008): The hidden track "She Said" appears 68 seconds after the end of "Here."
 Progress (2010): "Flowerbed" plays a while after "Eight Letters." The inclusion of a hidden track on this album was inspired by the fact that both a majority of Take That and Robbie Williams (who had recently rejoined the band) albums had featured hidden tracks.
 Talk Talk, Laughing Stock (1991): Some copies of the album close with an instrumental reprise outro.
 Tally Hall:
Complete Demos (2004): "Hidden in the Sand" is after the ninth track, "Ruler of Everything"
Marvin's Marvelous Mechanical Museum (2005): The 13th track, "13" is not listed on the artwork, and neither is the 15th, "Hidden in the Sand" (after "Ruler of Everything")
Admittedly Incomplete Demos (2015): A majority of this album (19 out of 29 tracks) is hidden from view on the download page.
 Taperecorder:
 Just Ramble & Think Of Ghosts (2010): A hidden tone appears at the end of the vinyl version of the album. The same tone starts off the follow up album.
 The Wyoming EP (2014): The hidden track "Ten Sleep" appears on a secret website which can be found by following links to the maps reference points, collecting clues, and entering them in sequence on the secret page.
 Tarantula A.D.: Book of Sand (2006): "If you deny me, I'll be lost" at 23:00 of last track; only on European version of the album
 Tasty Snax: Run Joseph Run (1999): An unlisted hidden track after the last track "Freedom."
 That Handsome Devil, A City Dressed in Dynamite (2008): "Atom Shell" (after Tree Food)
 The Coral, The Coral (2002): "Time Travel" starts 2 minutes after "Calendars & Clocks" ends.
 The Tea Party:
 The Edges of Twilight (1995): "The Edge of Twilight" (after "Walk With Me" features Irish singer Roy Harper on spoken word) much later on the same track, a sample of a microphone being dropped during a take of the song "Correspondences" can be heard.
 Transmission (1998): "Embryo," electronics, percussion and piano instrumental between "Babylon" and "Pulse"
 Tears for Fears, Songs from the Big Chair (1985): After the song "Head Over Heels," there is a live reprise of the previous track, "Broken," which is not listed on the original vinyl LP. This hidden track is listed on the CD pressing.
 Tenacious D, Tenacious D (2001): "Malibu Nights" (Begins at 8:15 of Track 21 "City Hall")
 Vienna Teng, Warm Strangers (2003): "Green Island Serenade" (Track 12)
 Terminaator, Head uudised: After the last song, a live version of "Televiisorimees," there is a cover of Kuldne Trio, "Kes ei tööta, see ei söö."
 Therapy?:
 Suicide Pact: You First: Whilst I Pursue My Way Unharmed (Begins eleven minutes after Sister)
 High Anxiety: Never Ending (Begins at 7:00 of track 11 Rust, after 30 seconds of silence)
 Troublegum: You Are My Sunshine (Begins immediately after track 14 "Brainsaw")
 They Might Be Giants
 Factory Showroom: Token Back to Brooklyn is hidden in pregap: rewind before opening track
 Severe Tire Damage: "Planet of the Apes", "Return to the Planet of the Apes", "Conquest of the Planet of the Apes", "Escape from the Planet of the Apes", "Battle for the Planet of the Apes", "Beneath the Planet of the Apes", "This Ape's for You"
 No!: Oranges is a bonus song accessed only by putting the CD in the computer and accessing the enhanced CD-ROM content. It is played when the credits are accessed.
 Robin Thicke: The Evolution of Robin Thicke: After the last track "Angels," there is an instrumental reprise of "2 The Sky."
 Think Twice: "Taivas" (1998): A humoristic song "Poikamiesjenkka" which tells about bachelors searching for a girlfriend is the last track of the CD, but is not mentioned in the covers
 Third Day:
 Conspiracy No. 5 (1997): A more aggressive reprise of "Who I Am" appears after track 13, "Your Love Endures."
 Offerings: A Worship Album (2000): "Don't Let Me Go," with Mark Lee on lead vocals, begins at 6:30 after the final track, "Love Song."
 Third Eye Blind:
 Blue (1999): after a very lengthy silence at the end of the album, a reprisal of "The Red Summer Sun" appears that continues after the original version's fade-out. Then the band members breathe into the microphones for a few seconds and laugh.
 Out of the Vein (2003): "Another Life" begins at 18:53 after track 13 "Good Man""
 This Train: Mimes of the Old West (1998): Unlisted song "The Great Atomic Power" appears as track 51, with silence on tracks 14–50.
This Is All Yours (2014): Hidden Track of Lovely Day beginning at 12:00 of Leaving Nara 
 Teddy Thompson:
 Teddy Thompson (eponymous 1st album): hidden track "I Wonder if I Care as Much" duet with Emmylou Harris
 Separate Ways: hidden track "Take A Message To Mary" duet with Linda Thompson
 A Piece of What You Need: hidden track "The Price of Love" duet with Ed Harcourt
 Paul Thorn: Hammer + Nail (1997): "Josie, the Jehovah's Witness Stripper" begins after ~six minutes of dead air after the last track on the c.d.
 George Thorogood & The Destroyers: Who Do You Love?: Hidden track of "I Drink Alone" after the final track "Who Do You Love? (Live version)."
 Thousand Foot Krutch, The Flame in All of Us: "The Last Song" plays after a pause after "Wish You Well"
 Threebrain: "Weeeeee!" (2001): The song "Poopies" ends at minute 1:18. After 30 seconds of silence (1:18 - 1:48) begins the hidden track "Secret Hidden Song" (1:48 - 3:00). This "hidden track" ends at 3:00 and, after 25 seconds of silence (3:00 - 3:25), begins another hidden track: it's a 5-seconds hidden spoken piece (3:25 - 3:30), that contains a speed guitar riff and a man that says "Giant stomp!", followed by an impact noise.
 Throwing Muses: Limbo (1996): White Bikini Sand (Begins at 4:20 of Shark)
 Tijuana Cartel: "The Come" (2008): contains a hidden last track (untitled) after the last listed track 'Something New'.
 Tilly and the Wall, Wild Like Children (2004): "The Ice Storm, Big Gust, and You" (untitled song, unofficially called "Some Names" by several fans)
 Justin Timberlake:
 The 20/20 Experience – 2 of 2: "Pair of Wings" after "Not a Bad Thing" ends.
 Justified: After the last track, "Never Again," there is a hidden track called "Worthy Of" on UK releases of the album.
 Tina Arena, In Deep: "Burn" acoustic piano version is a hidden track after the last track.
 Tinie Tempah:  Demonstration : "5 Minutes Is A few minutes after track 14
"Heroes"
 TISM:
 Form and Meaning Reach Ultimate Communion: country version of Defecate on My Face at track 6
 Great Truckin' Songs of the Renaissance: unlisted album credits track "The Ted Commandments"
 Hot Dogma: unlisted diatribe (track 23)
 Gentlemen, Start Your Egos: country version of Defecate on My Face at track 6
 The Beasts of Suburban: unlisted 2-minute interview and credits, then silence before low-volume track "Loser, Losing, Lost" (fan-applied title)
 Machiavelli and the Four Seasons: a cappella "Phillip Glass's Arse" after one minute of silence after final track
 Collected Recordings 1986–1993: Disc 1 contains an alternate cut of Take Your Love and A Tale of Two Fæces after 13 minutes of silence after track 19
 De Rigueurmortis: tracks 1, 4, 6, 9, 10, 12, 13, 14, 16, 18, 19, 22, 23, 25, 27, 29, and 30
 Toad the Wet Sprocket, Coil (1997): "Silo Lullaby" (accessible as a hidden QuickTime MOV file when read in a computer as a data CD)
 Today is the Day, Temple of the Morning Star: Sabbath Bloody Sabbath (begins at 4:44 of Track 17 Temple of the Morning Star)
 Tokio Hotel, Zimmer 483: The famous twin song, "In die Nacht" is a hidden title.
 Tomahawk: "Mit Gas" (2003): track 11 "Aktion 13F14" ends at 2:58 and an untitled instrumental piece begins at 3:23.
 Tommy Reilly: "Words on the Floor" (2009): Hidden track "I Don't Like Coffee," after "Entertaining Thoughts" on track 11.
 The Tony Danza Tapdance Extravaganza: "Danza III: The Series of Unfortunate Events" (2010): Hidden track about ten minutes after "12-21-12".
 Tool:
 Opiate (1992): "The Gaping Lotus Experience" An alternate groove on record, on CD it appears on track six at six minutes and six seconds.
 Undertow (1993): Although the song “Disgustipated” is listed on the back cover as track 10, after the song Flood ends tracks 10-68 are blank and “Disgustipated” is track 69, except in Japan where the bonus track "Opiate (live in Calgary, 10/11/1992)" is Track 69, Disgustipated is Track 70. There is also the sound of chirping crickets for 7 minutes and the muffled voice of Maynard's landlord at the end of the track from "Bill the Landlord”, timing the track to 15:49.
 Salival (2000): "Maynard's Dick" appears after the last track L.A.M.C on the audio CD
 Lateralus (2001): "Faaip de Oiad," even though listed on the album, starts immediately on track 13, but there's a gap consisting of two minutes of silence between that track and its predecessor ("Triad").
 The Tossers:
 Long Dim Road: "Got Lucky," starts at 6:05 mark of the final song "Ciara"
 Purgatory: "The Parting Glass" starts at 4:52 mark of the final song "Going Away"
 Total Eclipse: Access Denied (1999): Hidden track before first track.
 Toto, Livefields (1999): only on the French edition of the album. On the bonus disc there is "Spanish Steps of Rome" hidden
 Devin Townsend, Terria: Hidden track 'Humble' listed as number 11 on the CD.
 System of a Down, Toxicity: "Der Voghormia" or also known as "Arto" plays after "Aerials"
 Train, Train: Two extra tracks: "Train," and "Heavy" start after a minute of silence after "Swaying." However, on the independent release, the hidden track "The Highway" starts after the last track "Sorry For."
 Trapt, Trapt (2002): Hidden track at the end of "New Beginning"
 Travis:
 The Man Who (1999): "Blue Flashing Light" (end of the album). Some pressings of the US version also contain the songs "20" and "Only Molly Knows."
 The Invisible Band (2001): "Ring Out the Bell" and "You Don't Know What I'm Like" are included at the end of the album on some pressings of the US version.
 12 Memories (2003): "Some Sad Song" is included after "Walking Down the Hill" (while it is a hidden song in the sense that it does not have its own track number, it is considered to be the 'twelfth memory' of the album, and lyrics are printed in the accompanying booklet). The Japanese version also includes "Definition of Wrong" and "12th Memory."
 The Boy with No Name (2007): "Sailing Away" is included after "New Amsterdam," the final track of the album, at 4 minutes, 6 seconds into the track.
 Trentemoller, Lost (2013): An untitled piano piece begins 10:18 into the final track "Hazed", after about one and a half minutes of silence.
 Tripod, Middleborough Rd (2004) "That French Song" plays after "Astronaut"
 Truly (band), Feeling You Up (1997) An untitled song plays after "Repulsion"
 TRUSTcompany, True Parallels: Hidden track called "Retina" following numerous tracks featuring four seconds of silence each.
 Tub Ring:
 Drake Equation (2001): Unlisted dance techno track after "God Hates Astronauts"
 Fermi Paradox (2002): Unlisted track featuring children singing "Ring Around the Rosie" on top of a soft guitar track, then a chaotic electronic drum beat.
 Turbonegro:
 Party Animals (2005): Spoken-word piece "My Name Is Bojan Milankovic" at 5:36 of final track "Final Warning."
 Never Is Forever (1994): "Satan Och Kapitalet" hidden at the end of the album.
 Turin Brakes:
 The Optimist LP (2001): Instrumental track (with voices from an answering machine) "Three Days Old" can be heard several minutes after final track "The Optimist."
 Papercutz  "The Blur Between Us" (2012): instrumental Outro starts at 5:00 of final track "Where Beasts Die" containing leitmotif of track "Redenção".
 Ether Song (2003): The title track of this album is hidden and starts three and half minutes after final track "Rain City." The band have stated on their official site that the track is conceptually a secret track. The length of the song, over 8 minutes, also played a part in the decision to make the title track a hidden one.
 Jackinabox (2005): The final track of the album ("Come and Go") includes a hidden jam titled "Ambient 2." The band originally wanted to connect all the tracks with similar instrumental jams, but decided against it and instead included a jam session at the end of the album.
 TV on the Radio, Young Liars (2003): The unlisted final track is an a cappella rendition of the Pixies song "Mr Grieves."
 TÝR, How Far To Asgaard (2001): About 19 minutes into the last track, an unlisted Faroese 'kvæði'
 Twisted Sister, Stay Hungry (25th Anniversary) (2009): The bonus disc features a hidden track which is composed of a robotic voice singing the song "Lollipop Guild" from the 1939 Wizard of Oz movie

See also
 List of backmasked messages
 List of albums with tracks hidden in the pregap

References 

T